Westminster Presbyterian Theological Seminary is a theologically conservative Presbyterian school of theology based in Newcastle upon Tyne, England. It has a particular focus on preparing its students for planting churches in the UK and continental Europe.

The seminary offers a range of courses accredited through Greenville Presbyterian Theological Seminary, including the Master of Divinity (M.Div.).

History
Several ministers from the Evangelical Presbyterian Church in England and Wales were instrumental in the 2020 founding of the seminary.

Theology and doctrine
The school is committed to the Westminster Standards, experiential Calvinism, Presbyterian Church government, ordinary means of grace ministry, and the regulative principle of worship.

External links
Seminary Website

References

Protestant seminaries and theological colleges
Presbyterianism in England